Dundonald Church is an evangelical Church located in the Wimbledon area of the London Borough of Merton, London. Located in the suburb of Raynes Park, Dundonald is committed to preaching the Bible in keeping with the Reformed Evangelical tradition known as Calvinism. Dundonald is a part of the Co-Mission Initiative, a church-planting network in London, which houses its offices in the Church building. 

The Senior Pastor of Dundonald is Richard Coekin, who is also the CEO of Co-Mission.

Dundonald Church meets on Sundays, with three gatherings at 10am, 4pm and 6:30pm, with provision for children aged 0-11, at the 10 and 4.

History 
The Church was originally planted as "Emmanuel Dundonald" in 1990 by Emmanuel Church, Wimbledon, and met at Dundonald Primary School in Merton, before moving to its current location in 2008, which was originally the site of a former warehouse. In October 2019, construction began for the new three-story church building, and Dundonald temporarily moved to holding services at Wimbledon Chase Primary School, though, due to the ongoing COVID-19 pandemic, it also hosts services online. Originally expected to be completed in September 2021, the new building opened in February 2022. 

The church also runs The Coffee House, a donations-only coffee shop in the foyer of the building, open Monday-Friday.

References

External links 
Official website
Dundonald Church at FindAChurch.co.uk

Churches in the London Borough of Merton